"Some Way" is the debut single by Canadian rapper and singer Nav, released on February 15, 2017 from his self-titled mixtape. The song features fellow Canadian singer the Weeknd.

Music video
The music video for "Some Way" was released on March 3, 2017, on Nav's Vevo account and was directed by RJ Sanchez. As of November 2022, the video has surpassed over 73 million views.

Controversy
The song gained traction due to the content of the Weeknd's lyrics, which were widely interpreted as being aimed at singer Justin Bieber.

Charts

Certifications

Release history

Notes

References

2016 songs
2017 debut singles
Nav (rapper) songs
The Weeknd songs
Republic Records singles
XO (record label) singles
Songs written by Nav (rapper)
Songs written by the Weeknd
Song recordings produced by Nav (rapper)
Alternative hip hop songs